Events in the year 2021 in Israel.

Incumbents
 President of Israel – Reuven Rivlin until 7 July; Isaac Herzog
 Prime Minister of Israel – Benjamin Netanyahu until 13 June; Naftali Bennett
 President of the Supreme Court – Esther Hayut
 Chief of General Staff – Aviv Kochavi
 Government of Israel – thirty-fifth government of Israel and thirty-sixth government of Israel

Events

January

1 January – Israel reaches the milestone of one million COVID-19 vaccinations, over 11% of the population, since the inoculation campaign began on 20 December 2020.
13 January – The Israeli Air Force launches a series of airstrikes against Iranian targets in the Deir ez-Zor Governorate of Syria, killing dozens.
17 January – The government approves the appointment of Kobi Shabtai as the Commissioner of the Israel Police, following a two-year period without a permanent appointee.
24 January –
Israel opens an embassy in the United Arab Emirates with Eitan Na'eh as head of mission, in a temporary office until a permanent location is set up.
Haredi protestors riot in Bnei Brak against COVID restrictions.
25 January –
Israel extradites Malka Leifer to Australia, where she faces 74 charges in the Adass Israel School sex abuse scandal, after a six-year legal battle to extradite her.
The government bans all commercial flights into Israel until 31 January, to prevent the spread of more contagious variants of the COVID-19 virus.

February
1 February – In an online signing ceremony, Kosovo and Israel establish diplomatic relations, and Kosovo becomes the first Muslim-majority state to recognize Jerusalem as Israel's capital, committing to open its embassy in Jerusalem.
8 February – Prime Minister Benjamin Netanyahu appears in the Jerusalem District Court for a hearing in his corruption trial and formally denies the charges against him.
11 February – Aharon Haliva is appointed head of Aman.
20 February – More than half of Israel's Mediterranean coastline is contaminated by tar from oil spilled at sea, causing a major ecological disaster including widespread death of marine and coastal wildlife and illness to a number of volunteers who assist with clean up on the beaches.

March

1 March – The Israeli Supreme Court rules that the government must recognize Reform and Conservative converts to Judaism in Israel as Jews for the purpose of the Law of Return, entitled to Israeli citizenship in the same way as Orthodox converts.
17 March – Israel becomes the country with the highest vaccinated population per capita in the world against COVID-19.
23 March – The fourth legislative election in two years takes place to elect the 120 members of the 24th Knesset, with no bloc apparently winning a majority.

April
30 April - During a mass gathering in Meron to celebrate Lag BaOmer, 45 people are crushed to death while trying to exit through a narrow passage. Most victims belong to the Toldot Aharon hasidic movement.

May

 6 May – Violent clashes occur between Palestinians rioters and Israeli police in Sheikh Jarrah and the Old City of Jerusalem.
 10–21 May – Israel conducts aerial attacks dubbed "Operation Guardian of the Walls" in response to Hamas rocket attacks into Israeli territory – during the eleven-day campaign, more than 4,360 rockets and mortar shells are fired at Israel, of which 3,573 penetrate Israeli airspace, about 680 fall short inside the Gaza Strip and about 280 fall into the sea; the Iron Dome aerial defense system intercepts about 90% of the rocket fire; eleven Israeli civilians are directly killed by the rocket and mortar fire, two die as they run for shelter, several hundred are injured, and one soldier is killed when an anti-tank rocket hit his jeep; the rocket attacks force millions of civilians into bomb shelters and disrupt routine daily life throughout the country.
 10–17 May – Arab-Israeli protests and riots occur, particularly in towns with large Arab populations, and in intercommunal violence, Arab rioters set ten synagogues and 112 Jewish homes on fire, loot 386 Jewish homes and damaged another 673, and set 849 Jewish cars on fire and there are 5,018 recorded instances of stone-throwing against Jews; Jewish rioters damaged 13 Arab homes and set 13 Arab cars on fire, and there are 41 recorded instances of stone-throwing against Arabs; several people from  both communities are severely injured and two die.
16 May – Three killed and over 200 wounded on the night of Shavuot, due to a collapse of a tribune in a synagogue of the Carlin Stolin Hasidim in Givat Zeev.
 20 May – The foreign ministers of Germany, Heiko Maas, the Czech Republic, Jakub Kulhánek, and Slovakia, Ivan Korčok, visit Israel in a show of solidarity.
 22 May – Eden Alene represents Israel at the Eurovision Song Contest in Rotterdam with the song "Set Me Free".
 30 May – The embassy of the United Arab Emirates opens in Tel Aviv.

June

 1 June – Mossad chief David Barnea takes office and replaces Yossi Cohen.
2 June – Isaac Herzog is elected by the Knesset as the eleventh President of the State of Israel, to assume office on 9 July.
 2 June – Maccabi Tel Aviv defeats Hapoel Tel Aviv 2–1 to win the 2020–21 Israel State Cup in Association football at Bloomfield Stadium in Tel Aviv.
 13 June – The thirty-sixth government of Israel is sworn in at the Knesset, with Naftali Bennett as the initial Prime Minister of a coalition of right-wing, left-wing, centrist and Islamist parties, ending two years of political deadlock.
 15 June – The Health Ministry repeals the requirement for vaccinated adults in Israel to wear masks in most circumstances, as case numbers of COVID-19 fall to their lowest numbers since the start of the national vaccination campaign in December.
 24 June – During a state visit to Israel, Honduran President Juan Orlando Hernández opens his country's embassy to Israel in Jerusalem, the fourth country in recent years to do so.
 25 June – Health authorities reintroduce the requirement to wear face masks in all closed spaces as the number of COVID-19 cases rise again, primarily among unvaccinated children with the spread of the highly contagious Delta variant of the COVID-19 virus.
 27 June – The government appoints a three-member commission led by former chief justice Miriam Naor to  investigate the disaster at Mount Meron in April, which left 45 people dead and over 150 wounded.
  27 June – Members of the IDF National Rescue Unit arrive in Surfside, Florida, to assist with rescue efforts at a condominium collapse site and ultimately recover 81 of the 97 victims.

July

 7 July – Isaac Herzog takes office as the eleventh President of Israel.
11 July – The High Court rules that a provision of the Surrogacy Law, which prevents single men and same-sex couples from entering into a surrogacy arrangement must be amended to remove the restriction.
18 July – A scandal uncovered by media organizations revealed that the Pegasus spyware sold by the Israeli firm NSO to several countries was used to spy on activists, journalists, lawyers and politicians.
 23 July to 8 August – 90 athletes in 15 sports represent Israel at the 2020 Summer Olympics in Tokyo, in Israel's largest-ever Olympic delegation to date.
 23 July – For the first time since 11 Israeli athletes and a West German police officer were murdered during the Munich Olympics in 1972 by the Palestinian terrorist group Black September, a moment of silence is held during the opening ceremony of the Olympic Games.
 24 July – Avishag Semberg wins the bronze medal in Taekwondo, Israel's first medal of the 2020 Summer Olympics.
 31 July – The Israel national judo team wins the bronze medal in the Mixed-team Judo event.
 1 August – Artem Dolgopyat wins the gold medal in artistic gymnastics, Israel's third medal of the 2020 Summer Olympics and second-ever Olympic gold.
 7 August – Linoy Ashram wins the gold medal in rhythmic gymnastics, and becomes the first Israeli woman athlete to win gold at the Olympics.

August

 1 August – COVID-19 pandemic in Israel: Israel begins giving a third dose of the vaccine against COVID-19 to people above 60 in light of an outbreak of the Delta variant of the virus.
 8 August – Restrictions renewed by the government come into effect to slow the spread of the Delta variant of the COVID-19 virus and include expanding proof of vaccine and mask-wearing requirements for some gatherings, and a shift back to more remote work, quarantines, and travel restrictions.
 12 August COVID-19 pandemic in Israel: Israel begins giving a third dose of the vaccine against COVID-19 to people above 50.
 14 August – Israel issues a strong protest and downgrades its diplomatic representation to Poland following the enactment in Poland of a law that establishes a 30-year limit on administrative challenges to private property claims and effectively prevents restitution to heirs of property stolen by the Nazis in the Holocaust.
 15–17 August – Wildfires rage in the outskirts of Jerusalem, burning some 6,200 acres of forest in three days.
 17 August – Reichman University, formerly IDC Herzliya, is recognized by the Council for Higher Education in Israel as the first private university in Israel.
 22 August – Dani Dayan is appointed the new chairman of the Yad Vashem Holocaust memorial museum, succeeding Avner Shalev who had retired after 27 years as the head of the institution.
 24 August to 5 September – 33 athletes competing in 11 sports represent Israel at the 2020 Summer Paralympics in Tokyo, Japan.
 24 August – Iyad Shalabi wins the gold medal for the men's 100-meter backstroke in swimming and becomes the first Arab Israeli to win gold for Israel at the Paralympics.
 27 August – Mark Malyar wins the gold medal for the men's 200-meter individual medley and sets a new world record.
 28 August  Ami Omer Dadaon wins the silver medal for swimming in the men's 150 m individual medley SM4.
 29 August  Mark Malyar wins his second gold medal for swimming in the men's 400 m freestyle S7.
 29 August  Moran Samuel wins the silver medal for rowing in the women's single sculls.
 30 August  Ami Omer Dadaon wins his second medal, the gold medal for swimming in the men's 200 m freestyle S4.
 30 August  Mark Malyar wins his third medal, the bronze medal for swimming in the men's 100 m backstroke S7.
 2 September  Iyad Shalabi wins his second gold medal for swimming in the men's 50 metre backstroke S1.
 2 September  Ami Omer Dadaon wins his second gold medal and third medal overall for swimming in the men's 50 m freestyle S4.
 26 August  The Israeli Supreme Court rejects a claim by Moroccan immigrants to Israel that they be recognized as Holocaust victims who suffered under the Vichy race laws in Morocco during World War II and be granted state compensation payments, on the grounds that Moroccan authorities acted against Jews on their own accord, without being forced to do so by Nazi Germany.
 27 August – Prime Minister Naftali Bennett and US President Joe Biden meet for the first time at the White House, with the Iranian nuclear threat top of their agenda.
 30 August  The first ambassador of Bahrain to Israel, Khaled Yousif al-Jalahma, arrives in Israel following the 2020 agreement between the countries to establish diplomatic relations as part of the Abraham Accords.

September
 6 September – Six Palestinian prisoners, five from Islamic Jihad and one from Fatah, escape from the Gilboa prison in northern Israel; all are recaptured within two weeks.
 6 September – The sabbatical year, when most farmland in Israel is left to lie fallow in accordance with Jewish law, begins with the celebration of Rosh Hashanah for the Hebrew calendar year 5782.
 12 September – An apartment building in Holon collapses, destroying the homes of 36 families but without any casualties, the building having been evacuated the previous day.
14 September – The inaugural season of the UEFA Europa Conference League, the third tier of European club football, begins with Maccabi Tel Aviv winning 4–1 against Armenian club FC Alashkert.
 24 September – At a conference in Erbil, Iraqi Kurdistan, over 300 tribal leaders and participants call on the Iraqi government to end the state of war with Israel and normalize ties by joining the Abraham Accords.
 25 September –  Five members of Hamas are killed in the West Bank during an Israeli operation to arrest operatives suspected of planning a series of terrorist attacks in Israel.
 27 September – Prime Minister Naftali Bennet delivers his first speech to the United Nations General Assembly and addresses the COVID-19 pandemic and threats posed by Iran, but does not mention the  Israeli-Palestinian conflict.

October
 4 October – Prime Minister Bennett reveals that Mossad kidnapped an Iranian general in Syria to uncover information on the  whereabouts of missing pilot Ron Arad.
 6 October – During a state visit to the Ukraine, Israeli President Isaac Herzog, Ukrainian President Volodymyr Zelenskyy, and German President Frank-Walter Steinmeier attend the inauguration of a memorial to victims of Babyn Yar on the 80th anniversary of the Nazi massacre of 33,000 Jews in a ravine near Kiev in September 1941.
 7 October – The Israeli pavilion at Expo 2020 in Dubai is opened by Minister of Tourism Yoel Razvozov in the presence of Israeli and Emirati dignitaries and guests.
 10 October –  On her eighth and final visit to Israel as Chancellor of Germany, Angela Merkel visits Yad Vashem, meets with government officials and reaffirms that Germany will preserve a post-Holocaust commitment to Israel's security.
 14 October – Ronen Bar becomes the new director of the Shin Bet.
 18 October – Swedish Minister of Foreign Affairs Ann Linde visits Israel, ending a 7-year diplomatic freeze after Sweden officially recognized a Palestinian state in 2014.
20 October – The United Arab Emirates and Israel announce plans for a joint space exploration deal that will include a second moon-shot of Israel's Beresheet craft in 2024. 
 22 October – Prime Minister Naftali Bennett and Russian President Vladimir Putin hold their first official meeting in Sochi, Russia, to discuss bilateral trade relations, coordination regarding the Russian presence in Syria, and the regional and nuclear threats posed by Iran.
 22 October – Defense Minister Benny Gantz designates six Palestinian NGOs as terrorist organizations, on the grounds that they act on behalf of the Popular Front for the Liberation of Palestine.

November
 1 November – Prime Minister Naftali Bennet leads a delegation of over a hundred, including the Minister of Energy, Karine Elharrar and the Minister of Environmental Protection, Tamar Zandberg, to the  United Nations Climate Change Conference (COP26), where he commits Israel to phasing out coal for energy generation by 2025, and reaching net zero for greenhouse gas emissions by 2050, and announces that the government has set up a task-force to provide funds and reduce bureaucracy to encourage the Israeli hi-tech sector to develop solutions to combat climate change.
 5 November – After a marathon and often acrimonious session, the Knesset passes the 2021 and 2022 state budgets, the country's first approved national budgets in three and half years, and avoids triggering another round of early elections as a result.
 21 November – A Hamas terrorist opens fire in the Old City of Jerusalem, killing an Israeli man and wounding four others, before being shot and killed by Israeli police officers. 
 22 November – Jordan and Israel sign an agreement at the Dubai Expo brokered by the United Arab Emirates by which a UAE company will build a solar power plant in Jordan from which Israel will buy electricity in exchange for water from an Israeli desalination plant.
 23 November – The COVID-19 vaccination campaign for children aged 5–11 begins, seeking to curtail the spread of COVID-19 in schools and close the main remaining gap in the country's push for national immunity from the pandemic.
 23 November – At an archaeological dig at the Jerusalem Walls National Park, an 11-year-old girl finds a rare 2,000-year-old silver shekel coin, engraved with "second year," referring to the second year of the Great Jewish Revolt against the Romans (66–73 CE).
 24 November – In Rabat, Morocco, Minister of Defense Benny Gantz and his Moroccan counterpart, Abdellatif Loudiyi, sign a memorandum of understanding on defense between Israel and Morocco, the first such agreement between Israel and an Arab state formalizing defense ties and cooperation.
 26 November – Israel announces a ban on foreigners entering the country to curb the spread of the new Omicron variant of Covid-19.

December
 6 December – Israel signs the Horizon Europe agreement with the EU despite the exclusion of Israeli settlements.
 7 December – Israel finishes building a 65-kilometer underground barrier in its border with Gaza to deal with the threat of cross-border tunnels.
 12 December – The Miss Universe 2021 pageant takes place in Eilat where Miss India, Harnaaz Sandhu, is crowned Miss Universe; Israel is represented by Noa Cochva.
 12 December – Archeologists announce the discovery of a 2,000-year-old synagogue from the Second Temple period in the town of Migdal, in the Galilee region.
 13 December – Prime Minister Naftali Bennett and Sheikh Mohamed bin Zayed Al Nahyan of the United Arab Emirates discuss strengthening bilateral trade and cooperation in multiple areas, at the first meeting of the leaders of the two countries.
 14 December – Researchers from Tel Aviv University, Sheba Medical Center and from institutes in Europe and the United States announce that they have uncovered a mechanism that may unlock a way to delay or reverse the causes of the neurodegenerative disease ALS, for which there is currently no treatment.
 16 December – an Israeli man is killed, and two others are injured, in a shooting near Homesh in the northern West Bank by gunmen suspected to belong to the Palestinian Islamic Jihad terror group.
 17 December – Anastasia Gorbenko wins the first gold medal for Israel at the World Swimming Championships for the 50-meter breaststroke, followed by a second gold medal in the 100-meter individual medley two days later. 
 20 December – The Carmel storm hits Israel with heavy rainfall and strong winds.
27 December –  An outbreak of H5N1 avian influenza in Northern Israel kills thousands of migratory cranes, and hundreds of thousands of domestic poultry are culled in  a bid to halt the spread of the disease.
 30 December – The Central Bureau of Statistics releases data showing that 9.449 million people live in Israel at the end of 2021, of whom 6.982 million (74%) are Jewish, 1.99 million (21%) are Arab and 472,000 (5%) are neither.

Deaths

 18 January – Dani Shmulevich-Rom (b. 1940), Maccabi Haifa football player (1957–1973) and Israel national football team (1960–1970).
 24 January – Moshe Moskowitz (b. 1925), politician, head of the Shafir Regional Council (1952–1979) and Efrat town council (1980–1985).
 31 January – Yitzchok Scheiner (b. 1922), Haredi rabbi and rosh yeshiva of the Kamenitz Yeshiva of Jerusalem.
 31 January – Meshulam Dovid Soloveitchik (b. 1921), Haredi rabbi and rosh yeshiva of the Brisk Yeshiva in Jerusalem.
 31 January – Abraham J. Twerski, (b. 1930), Hasidic rabbi, author, and psychiatrist specializing in substance abuse.
 5 February – Ruth Dayan, (b. 1917), businesswoman, founder of Maskit fashion house, social activist and recipient of the President's Medal of Distinction.
 8 February – Shlomo Hillel (b. 1923), politician and diplomat, Speaker of the Knesset (1984–1988), Minister of Police (1969–1977) and Internal Affairs (1977).
 15 February – Gideon Meir (b. 1947), diplomat, ambassador to Italy (2006–2011).
 18 February – Yehoshua Sagi (b. 1933), Director of the Military Intelligence Directorate (1979–1983) and member of the Knesset (1988–1992).
 23 February – Sergiu Natra (b. 1924), classical music composer, conductor, and professor of music at Tel-Aviv University.
 25 February – Manfred Gerstenfeld (b.1937), economist, author and scholar of antisemitism.
 25 February – Rafi Levi (b. 1938), footballer for Maccabi Tel Aviv (1954-1966) and Israel national football team (1958–1960).
 7 March – Mordechai Bar-On (b.1928), historian and politician, member of the Knesset (1984–1986).
 12 March – Roei Sadan (b. 1982), adventurer and cyclist who circumnavigated the world on his bicycle.
 4 April – Uri Gallin (b.1928), Israeli Olympic discus thrower (1952).
 9 April – Gavriel Cohen (b. 1928), historian and politician, member of the Knesset (1965–1969).
 13 April – Isi Leibler (b. 1934), activist, publicist, World Jewish Congress official and leader in the global campaign on behalf of Soviet Jewry.
 28 April – Hussein Faris (b. 1935), Israeli Arab politician and member of the Knesset (1988–1992).
 4 May – Dan Tawfik (b. 1955), biochemist  at the Weizmann Institute of Science, known for contributions in protein engineering, evolutionary biochemistry and enzyme evolution, EMET Prize (2020).
 6 May – Yitzhak Arad (b.1926), military officer and historian, director of Yad Vashem (1972–1993).
 13 May – Bella Kaufman (b.1956), oncologist, head of department at Sheba Medical Center, and professor at Sackler Faculty of Medicine at Tel Aviv University.
 22 May – Moti Rosenblum (b. 1946), journalist at Maariv and IDF Radio, CEO of the Israel Press and Communications Council.
 22 May – Eddy Zemach (b.1935), philosopher, Professor Emeritus in the Department of Philosophy at the Hebrew University of Jerusalem.
 25 May – David Klein (b. 1935), economist, governor of the Bank of Israel (2000–2005).
 25 May – Eilat Mazar (b. 1956), archaeologist, specialist in Jerusalem, Phoenician and Biblical archaeology, noted for her discovery of the Large Stone Structure, surmised to be the palace of King David.
 25 May – Amichai Shoham (b. 1922), footballer for Hapoel Petah Tikva F.C. (1941–1954) and the Israel national football team (1949-1952).
 29 May – Dani Karavan (b. 1930), sculptor known for site specific memorials and monuments and Israel Prize winner.
 31 May –  (b. 1927), Iraqi-born poet, journalist and translator.
 6 June – Avi Har-Even (b. 1937), engineer, head of the Israel Space Agency (1995-2004).
 22 June – Tsevi E. Tal (b. 1927), district court judge (1978–1994), and Supreme Court justice (1994–1997), head of the Tal Committee on exemptions from military service for ultra-Orthodox Jews (1999-2000).
 29 June – Yitzhak "Vicky" Peretz (b. 1953), national league and  national team (1973–1983) football player, and team manager.
 14 July – Yekutiel Gershoni (b. 1943), historian and runner, Paralympic silver medalist for athletics at the 1980 Summer Paralympics and 1984 Summer Paralympics.
 15 July – Mohamed Nafa (b. 1940), Israeli Druze politician, Secretary General of the Israel Communist Party and Member of Knesset (1990–1992).
 20 July – Ruth Pearl (b. 1935), Israeli-American software developer, mother of slain American journalist Daniel Pearl.
 24 July –  (b. 1950), artistic director of the Cameri and Habima Theaters, and the Israel Festival.
 26 July –  (b. 1947), journalist specializing in military affairs.
 26 July – Elad Peled (b. 1927), military officer, public servant and educator.
 28 July –  (b. 1946), actor, film director and music producer.
 2 August  Ruth Horam (b. 1931), painter and sculptor, winner of the Jerusalem Prize.
 6 August  Aryeh Gamliel (b. 1951), Israeli rabbi and politician, member of the Knesset for the Shas Party (1988–2003).
 9 August  Naftali Tishby (b. 1952), professor of computer science and computational neuroscientist at the Hebrew University of Jerusalem.
 11 August  Yehoshua Zuckerman (b. 1938), Religious Zionist rabbi and teacher, specialist in the writings of Rabbi Abraham Isaac Kook.
 12 August  Igael Tumarkin (b. 1933), painter and sculptor, winner of the Israel Prize for Sculpture in 2004.
 12 August  Stephen Wiesner (b. 1942), research physicist in the area of quantum information theory, professor at Tel Aviv University.
 25 August – Said al-Harumi (b. 1972),  Negev Bedouin politician, member of the Knesset for the Joint List and the United Arab List (2017–2021).
 13 September – Baruch Nachshon (b. 1939), Chabad Hasidic artist.
 14 September – Ida Nudel (b. 1931), Soviet-born refusenik and civil rights activist on behalf of "Prisoners of Zion" in the Soviet Union.
 20 September –  (b. 1948),  Israeli blues rock singer.
 21 September – Aharon Abuhatzira (b. 1938), Israeli politician, member of Knesset (1977–1992), Minister of Religious Services (1977–1981) and Labor and Social Services (1981–1982).
 21 September – Marcia Freedman (1938), feminist and civil rights activist, Member of Knesset (1974–1977).
 22 September – Eric Alfasi (1972), Israeli basketball player for Maccabi Netanya and coach of Maccabi Ashdod and Hapoel Eilat.
  26 September –  (b. 1936), film director and producer, poet, and Winner of the Israel Prize (2009).
 26 September – Herzl Shafir (b. 1929), IDF general, commissioner of Israel Police (1980).
 5 October – Yosef Paritzky (b. 1955), member of Knesset (1999–2006) and Minister of National Infrastructures (2003–2004).
 8 October – Nola Chilton (b. 1922), acting teacher and theater director who pioneered socially engaged theater in Israel, recipient of the Israel Prize for Theater (2013).
 8 October – Mordechai Geldman (b. 1946),  psychologist, poet, writer, artist, art critic and curator, and recipient of the Bialik Prize for lifetime achievements.
 9 October – Yossi Maiman (b. 1946), banking executive, businessman and president (2002–2013) and CEO (2006–2013) of Ampal-American Israel Corporation.
 14 October –  (b. 1942), writer, songwriter and screenwriter, and mayor of Beit Shean (1974–1983).
 15 October –  (b. 1933), author and playwright, winner of the Israel Prize for Theatre (2003).
 26 October – Nawaf Massalha (b. 1943), member of the Knesset (1988–2003), first Israeli Arab politician to hold a ministerial position, Deputy Minister of Health (1992–1996), and Deputy Minister of Foreign Affairs (1999–2001).
 26 October – Uri Rubin (b. 1944), professor of Arabic and Islamic Studies at Tel Aviv University, contributor to the Encyclopaedia of Islam and other works.
 29 October – Eliyahu Matza (b. 1935), judge and justice of the Supreme Court (1991–2005).
 31 October – Avishag Zahavi (1922), botanist, professor emeritus of Plant Physiology at The Volcani Center for Agricultural Research at Bet-Dagan. 
 4 November – Amatsia Levkovich (b. 1937), football player for Hapoel Tel Aviv (1955–1968), and national team (1957–1965), and professional coach (1969–1994).
 18 November – Zvi Zilker (b. 1933), longest-serving mayor of Ashdod (1969–1983, 1989–2008).
 24 November – Aryeh Nehemkin (1925), member of the Haganah, lieutenant colonel in the Israel Defense Forces, Secretary of the Moshavim Movement (1970–1981),  member of Knesset for the Alignment (1981–1988) and Minister of Agriculture (1984–1988).
 30 November – G. Yafit (b.1951), advertising executive and owner of the Steimatzky bookstore chain.
 18 December – Eliezer Waldman (b. 1937), Orthodox rabbi and politician, Member of Knesset for Tehiya 1984–1990, and co-founder and head of Yeshivat Nir Kiryat Arba.
 27 December –  (b. 1950), basketball coach for Hapoel Tel Aviv and Maccabi Tel Aviv.
 27 December – Chaim Walder (b. 1968), Haredi rabbi and author, accused rapist, suicide by gunshot.

See also

 2019–2021 Israeli political crisis
 COVID-19 pandemic in Israel
 Israel at the 2020 Summer Olympics (held in 2021) 
 Timeline of the Israeli–Palestinian conflict in 2021

References

 
2020s in Israel
Years of the 21st century in Israel
Israel
Israel